Lordopini is a weevil tribe in the subfamily Entiminae.

Genera 
Acanthobrachis – Aeuryomus – Alocorhinus – Anidopsis – Atomorhinus – Aulametopus – Conidus – Conothorax – Deroconus – Diaprosomus – Dioryrhinus – Elytroxys – Eudmetus – Eurylobus – Euryomus – Euscapus – Euthyreus – Eutypus – Granadia – Hemieuryomus – Hypoptophila – Hypoptus – Hypsonotolobus – Hypsonotus – Lasiocnemoides – Lasiopus – Leptodomus – Lordopella – Lordops – Merodontus – Microstictius – Nesolordops – Omoionotus – Orthocnemus – Pachyconus – Prasocella – Pseudhypoptus – Rescapus – Stenorhinus – Sulla – Tomometopus – Tomorhinus – Trichocnemus – Tropidorrhinus

References 

 Schönherr, C.J. 1823: Curculionides [Tabula synoptica familiae Curculionidum]. Isis von Oken, 1823(10): 1132-1146
 Alonso-Zarazaga, M.A.; Lyal, C.H.C. 1999: A world catalogue of families and genera of Curculionoidea (Insecta: Coleoptera) (excepting Scolytidae and Platypodidae). Entomopraxis, Barcelona

External links 

Entiminae
Polyphaga tribes